Antoine, 1st comte de Noailles (4 September 150411 March 1563) became admiral of France, and was ambassador in England for three years, 1553–1556, maintaining a gallant but unsuccessful rivalry with the Spanish ambassador, Simon Renard.

Antoine was the eldest of three brothers who served as French diplomats, three of the 19 children of Louis de Noailles and Catherine de Pierre-Buffière.

His career started at the age of 25 with a trip with Francis de la Tour, Viscount of Turenne, to Spain to arrange the marriage of Francis I of France with Eleanor of Austria, and he signed the final marriage contract. He then helped in the Italian wars and two missions to Scotland in 1548.

His brothers Gilles and François were clergymen. His wife was Jeanne de Gontaut, who following his death, became a lady-in-waiting to Catherine de Medici.

Notes

References

 

Attribution:

1504 births
1562 deaths
Antoine, 1st count of
Antoine
16th-century French diplomats
French Navy admirals
Ambassadors of France to England
People of the Tudor period
Court of Mary I of England